Amire Bi Gazand means Harmless Ruler is the eighth official studio album by Iranian singer Mohsen Chavoshi. The album is a record for the most downloads in Persian music.

Track listing

See also
 Rumi
 Saadi Shirazi

References

External links
 

 Mohsen Chavoshi on Spotify

2016 albums
Mohsen Chavoshi albums